Jean-Louis Servan-Schreiber (31 October 193728 November 2020) was a French journalist. He was the co-founder of L'Expansion and the founder of Psychologies and Radio Classique. He was the author of several books.

Early life
Jean-Louis Servan-Schreiber was born on 31 October 1937, in Boulogne-Billancourt, France. His father, Émile Servan-Schreiber, was a French journalist of Jewish-Prussian descent. His mother was Denise Bresard. The Servan-Schreibers (up to 200 members) have a family reunion every five years.

As a child Servan-Schreiber aspired to become a psychoanalyst but, being born into a family of journalists went into that profession.  He graduated from Sciences Po in 1960.

Career
Servan-Schreiber was a journalist. He first wrote for Echos, which had been co-founded by his father, followed by L'Express which had been founded by his brother Jean-Jacques Servan-Schreiber. Having experience of reading American news magazines from a period spent teaching at Stanford University Servan-Schreiber worked with his brother to transform L'Express into a similar publication, the first of its kind in France.

Servan-Schreiber went on to found his own press company, L'Expansion, in 1967 with Jean Boissonnat.  He co-founded the magazine L'Expansion with Boissonnat in 1967 and Lire with Bernard Pivot in 1975. Servan-Schreiber would remain a director of L'Expansion for 27 years, and expand it to several foreign editions.  He founded Radio Classique in 1982. He was the owner of La Vie Éco, a Moroccan newspaper, from 1994 to 1997, having acquired a special exemption from that nation's foreign ownership rules via Moroccan prime minister Abdellatif Filali. Servan-Schreiber took over Psychologies in 1997, and sold it to the Lagardère Group in 2008 having increased its circulation from 75,000 to 350,000 to become the second best-selling women's monthly in France. He founded another magazine, Clés, in 2010.  At times the L'Expansion group also ran La Vie Financière, La Lettre de L’Expansion and La Tribune.

During the 1970s Servan-Schreiber appeared frequently on the TF1 programme Questionnaire.  Servan-Schreiber was the author of several books and around twenty essays.  He served as the chairman of the French chapter of Human Rights Watch since 2007.  Servan-Schreiber was known by the initials JLSS.

Personal life
Servan-Schreiber was married twice. He married his first wife, Claude Sadoc, in 1957. They had four children; she is now married to a woman, former politician Françoise Gaspard. In 1987, he married his second wife, Perla.

He died from COVID-19 on 28 November 2020, at the age of 83.

Works

References

2020 deaths
1937 births
People from Boulogne-Billancourt
Sciences Po alumni
French journalists
Human Rights Watch people
French people of German-Jewish descent
Deaths from the COVID-19 pandemic in France